Madeul Station is a station on the Seoul Subway Line 7. Its name is pure Korean, hence there is no Hanja equivalent. The name presumably comes from a nearby place where horses were kept.

Station layout

References 

Railway stations opened in 1996
Metro stations in Nowon District
Seoul Metropolitan Subway stations